Mariane Chan (born 1 August 1972) is a Hong Kong actress.

Television series
Love is Beautiful (TVB, 2002)
Lost in Love (大囍之家) (TVB, 2000)
Witness to a Prosecution (TVB, 1999)
Life for Life (命轉情真) (TVB, 1999)
Road to Eternity (TVB, 1999)
Ultra Protection (TVB, 1999)
Happy Ever After (TVB, 1999)
Journey to the West II (TVB, 1998)
A Place of One's Own (TVB serie) (大澳的天空) (TVB, 1998)
A Tough Side of a Lady (TVB, 1998)
The Disappearance (TVB, 1997)
Drunken Angels (男人四十打功夫) (TVB, 1997)
Journey to the West (TVB, 1996)
The Criminal Investigator II (TVB, 1996)
Nothing to Declare (緝私群英) (TVB, 1996)
Money Just Can't Buy (天降財神) (TVB, 1996)
Ancient Heroes (隋唐群英會) (TVB, 1996)
When a Man Loves a Woman (新同居關係) (TVB, 1994)
Knot to Treasure (婚姻物語) (TVB, 1994)
Glittering Moments (TVB, 1994)

References

External links

1972 births
Living people
Actresses from Guangdong
Hong Kong emigrants to the United States
Hong Kong television actresses
Chinese television actresses
20th-century Chinese actresses
21st-century Chinese actresses
20th-century Hong Kong actresses
21st-century Hong Kong actresses
TVB actors